The 2021–22 The Citadel Bulldogs basketball team represented The Citadel, The Military College of South Carolina in the 2021–22 NCAA Division I men's basketball season. The Bulldogs, led by seventh-year head coach Duggar Baucom, played their home games at McAlister Field House in Charleston, South Carolina, as members of the Southern Conference. They finished the season 13–18, 6–12 in SoCon play to finish in ninth place. The defeated East Tennessee State in the first round of the SoCon tournament before losing to Chattanooga in the quarterfinals.

On March 10, 2022, the school fired head coach Duggar Baucom. On March 23, the school named former Minnesota and Vanderbilt assistant Ed Conroy the team's new head coach. Conroy was the head coach of the Bulldogs from 2006 to 2010.

Previous season
In a season limited due to the ongoing COVID-19 pandemic, the Bulldogs finished the 2020–21 season 13–13, 5–11 in SoCon play to finish in eighth place. They defeated Western Carolina in the first round of the SoCon tournament before losing to UNC Greensboro in the quarterfinals.

Roster

Schedule and results

|-
!colspan=12 style=| Non-conference regular season

|-
!colspan=12 style=| SoCon regular season

|-
!colspan=12 style=| SoCon tournament

|-

Source

References

The Citadel Bulldogs basketball seasons
Citadel
Citadel Bulldogs basketball
Citadel Bulldogs basketball